Behavior-based safety (BBS) is the "application of science of behavior change to real world safety problems". or "A process that creates a safety partnership between management and employees that continually focuses people's attentions and actions on theirs, and others, daily safety behavior." BBS "focuses on what people do, analyzes why they do it, and then applies a research-supported intervention strategy to improve what people do". At its very core BBS is based on a larger scientific field called organizational behavior management.

In a safety management system based upon the hierarchy of hazard control, BBS may be applied to internalise hazard avoidance strategies or administrative controls (including use of personal protective equipment), but should not be used in preference to the implementation of reasonably practicable safety measures further up the hierarchy.

To be successful a BBS program must include all employees, from the CEO to the front line workers including hourly, salary, union employees, contractors and sub-contractors. To achieve changes in behavior, a change in policy, procedures and/or systems most assuredly will also need some change. Those changes cannot be done without buy-in and support from all involved in making those decisions.

BBS is not based on assumptions, personal feeling, and/or common knowledge. To be successful, the BBS program used must be based on scientific knowledge.

References

Further reading
 Behavior-Based Safety Case Studies Center for Behavioral Safety
 Focus on Behavior to Manage Risk the Right Way Dr. Thomas E. Boyce
 Krause, Thomas R. Leading With Safety. Hoboken, NJ, Wiley Publishing Company, 2005
 Cooper. Dominic. Behavioral Safety: A Framework for Success. BSMS 2009 

Organizational behavior
Hazard analysis